Anna Karenina is a 1948 British film based on the 1877 novel of the same title by the Russian author Leo Tolstoy.

The film was directed by Julien Duvivier, and starred  Vivien Leigh in the title role. It was produced by Alexander Korda (with Herbert Mason as associate producer) for his company, London Films, and distributed in the United States by 20th Century Fox. The screenplay was by Jean Anouilh, Julien Duvivier and Guy Morgan, music by Constant Lambert, decors by André Andrejew and deep focus cinematography by Henri Alekan.

Plot
Anna Karenina is married to Alexei Karenin, a cold government official in St Petersburg who is apparently more interested in his career than in satisfying the emotional needs of his wife. Called to Moscow by her brother Stepan Oblonsky, a reprobate who has been unfaithful to his trusting wife Dolly once too often, Anna meets Countess Vronsky on the night train to Moscow. They discuss their sons, with the Countess showing Anna a picture of her son Count Vronsky, a cavalry officer.

Vronsky shows up at the train to meet his mother, and is instantly infatuated with Anna. He boldly makes his interest known to her, which Anna demurely pushes away – but not emphatically so. At a grand ball, Vronsky continues to pursue the married Anna, much to the delight of the gossiping spectators. But Kitty Shcherbatsky, Dolly's sister who is smitten with Vronsky, is humiliated by his behaviour and leaves the ball – much to the distress of Konstantin Levin, a suitor of Kitty's who was rejected by her in favour of Vronsky. However, after a change of heart, Kitty marries Levin.

Boldly following Anna back to St Petersburg, Vronsky makes it known to society that he is the companion of Anna – a notion she does nothing to stop. Soon, society is whispering about the affair, and it's only a matter of time before Karenin learns of the relationship. Outwardly more worried about his social and political position than his wife's passion, he orders her to break off with Vronsky or risk losing her son. She tries, but cannot tear herself away from Vronsky.

Leaving Karenin, Anna becomes pregnant with Vronsky's child. Almost dying in childbirth (the child is stillborn), Anna begs Karenin for forgiveness, which he coldly grants. Karenin, being magnanimous, allows Vronsky the notion that he may visit Anna if she calls for him. Embarrassed by the scandal, Vronsky tries to shoot himself, but fails.

Anna tries again to live with Karenin, but cannot get Vronsky out of her head. She leaves Karenin for good, abandoning her child to live in Italy with Vronsky. But her doubts over Vronsky's feelings for her grow, and she eventually pushes him away. Realizing that she has lost everything, Anna walks onto the railway tracks and commits suicide by letting the train hit her.

Cast

 Vivien Leigh as Anna Karenina
 Ralph Richardson as Alexei Karenin
 Kieron Moore as Count Vronsky
 Hugh Dempster as Stefan Oblonsky
 Mary Kerridge as Dolly Oblonsky
 Marie Lohr as Princess Shcherbatsky
 Frank Tickle as Prince Schcherbatsky
 Sally Ann Howes as Kitty Shcherbatsky 
 Niall MacGinnis as Konstantin Levin
 Bernard Rebel as Professor Leverrin
 Michael Gough as Nicholai (Gough's film debut)
 Martita Hunt as Princess Betty Tversky
 Heather Thatcher as Countess Lydia Ivanovna
 Helen Haye as Countess Vronsky
 Michael Medwin as Kitty's doctor
 Gino Cervi as Enrico
 Beckett Bould as Matvey
 Leslie Bradley as Korsunsky
 Therese Giehse as Marietta
 John Longden as General Serpuhousky
 Mary Matlew as Princess Nathalia
 Valentina Murch as Annushka
 Judith Nelmes as Miss Hull
 Ruby Miller as Countess Meskov
 John Salew as Lawyer
 Patrick Skipwith as Sergei
 Ann South as Princess Sorokina
 Jeremy Spenser as Giuseppe
 Austin Trevor as Colonel Vronsky
 Gus Verney as Prince Makhotin

This was the film debut for both Barbara Murray and Maxine Audley.

Production
Michael Redgrave was to play the male lead but elected to accept a Hollywood offer instead. Vivien Leigh previously had an uncredited role as a schoolgirl extra in Things Are Looking Up, which Herbert Mason worked on as an associate producer.

Filming started on 15 April 1947. Filming took place in London Film Studios, Shepperton.

Reception
The film was picketed at some cinemas in the United States by members of the anti-British organisation known as the Sons of Liberty, as part of that Zionist group's protests against British films, in connection with events in Mandatory Palestine..

References

Bibliography
 Lentz III, Harris M. (2015). Obituaries in the Performing Arts, 2014. McFarland

External links
 
 
 
 

1948 films
1940s English-language films
British black-and-white films
Romantic period films
Films based on Anna Karenina
Films directed by Julien Duvivier
Compositions by Constant Lambert
Films produced by Alexander Korda
Films produced by Herbert Mason
Films about infidelity
Films with screenplays by Jean Anouilh
London Films films
1940s historical drama films
British historical drama films
1948 drama films
1940s British films